is a first-person shooter role-playing video game developed by Media.Vision and published by Sony Computer Entertainment for the PlayStation. It was among the first video games published by Sony Computer Entertainment. A sequel, Crime Crackers 2, was released in 1997.

Gameplay 

Crime Crackers is a first-person shooter with role-playing elements.

Development and release 

The game was developed by Media.Vision, with development support from Japan Studio, and was published by Sony Computer Entertainment. The music was composed by Noriyuki Asakura, who would gain notoriety through his work on the Rurouni Kenshin anime adaptation and the Tenchu series.

It was re-released on PlayStation Network on October 24, 2007.

Reception 

Crime Crackers garnered mixed response from critics since its release, most of which reviewed it as an import title. Next Generation wrote that "Crime Crackers may, in the future, find an audience with younger gamers who're looking for their first taste of role-playing adventure, but the game is unlikely to make a significant mark elsewhere."

Notes

References

External links 

 Crime Crackers at GameFAQs
 Crime Crackers at Giant Bomb
 Crime Crackers at MobyGames

1994 video games
First-person shooters
Media.Vision games
Japan-exclusive video games
PlayStation (console) games
PlayStation Network games
Role-playing video games
Science fiction video games
Single-player video games
Sony Interactive Entertainment games
Video game franchises introduced in 1994
Video games developed in Japan
Video games featuring female protagonists
Video games scored by Noriyuki Asakura